Pouteria crassiflora is a species of plant in the family Sapotaceae. It is endemic to Brazil.  It is threatened by habitat loss.

References

Flora of Brazil
crassiflora
Vulnerable plants
Taxonomy articles created by Polbot
Taxa named by João Murça Pires